Kuulmajärv Landscape Conservation Area is a nature park in Põlva County, Estonia.

Its area is 1016 ha.

The protected area was designated in 1983 to protect Koolma Lake and its surrounding areas. In 2005, the protected area was redesigned to the landscape conservation area.

References

Nature reserves in Estonia
Geography of Põlva County